Vera Watson (1932 – October 17, 1978) was an American computer programmer, mountaineer and rock climber who made the first woman's solo climb of Acongagua, the highest mountain in the Americas. She also made several first ascents in the Kenai Mountains in Alaska. She was a member of the successful first all-women team to climb Annapurna, but was killed along with her partner Alison Chadwick-Onyszkiewicz while preparing to attempt the unclimbed central summit of the mountain.

 Picture and obituary.

Watson worked at IBM Research in San Jose, California, from 1973 onwards. She was initially active in machine translation, before moving into database management system design. She worked on System R, which was the first implementation of SQL, a standardised database query language which has since become a dominant standard. She took a leave without pay to make the solo attempt on Aconcagua, and then again for the expedition to Annapurna. She was married to John McCarthy, a pioneer in the discipline of artificial intelligence and creator of the Lisp programming language.

See also 

 American Women's Himalayan Expedition

References

External links
 .
 .
 .
 .

American female climbers
Mountaineering deaths
1932 births
1978 deaths
20th-century American women